Veniamin Fyodorovich Kagan (10 March 1869 – 8 May 1953) was a Russian and Soviet mathematician and expert in geometry. He is the maternal grandfather of mathematicians Yakov Sinai and Grigory Barenblatt.

Biography
Kagan was born in Shavli, in the Kovno Governorate of the Russian Empire (now Šiauliai, Lithuania) in 1869, to a poor Lithuanian Jewish family. In 1871 his family moved to Yekaterinoslav (now Dnipro), where he grew up. Kagan entered the Imperial Novorossiya University in Odesa in 1887, but was expelled for revolutionary activities in 1889. He was put on probation and sent back to Yekaterinoslav. He studied mathematics on his own and in 1892 passed the state exam at Kyiv University.

In 1894 Kagan moved to Saint Petersburg where he continued his studies with Andrey Markov and Konstantin Posse. They tried to help him to obtain an academic position, but Kagan's Jewish background was an obstacle. Only in 1897 was he allowed to become a dozent at the Imperial Novorossiya University, where he continued to work until 1923. His students in the theory of relativity class he taught in 1921-22 included Nikolai Papaleksi, Alexander Frumkin and Igor Tamm.

Kagan worked at Moscow State University where he held the Geometry Chair from 1923 till 1952.

In 1924 he joined Otto Schmidt in drawing up plans for the Great Soviet Encyclopedia.

Mathematical work
He published over 100 mathematical papers in different parts of geometry, particularly on hyperbolic geometry and on Riemannian geometry. He received the Stalin Prize in 1943. He founded the science publisher Mathesis in Odesa. He was a director of the mathematics and natural sciences department of the Great Soviet Encyclopedia. He wrote a definitive biography of Nikolai Lobachevsky and edited his collected works (5 volumes, 1946–1951).

Kagan's doctoral students include Viktor Wagner and Isaak Yaglom.

Trivia
 He's a minor character in The Fourth Prose (1930) by Osip Mandelstam.

External links 
 
 
 Biography – in the "Kstati" newspaper (in Russian)

1869 births
1953 deaths
19th-century mathematicians from the Russian Empire
20th-century Russian mathematicians
Mathematicians from the Russian Empire
People from Šiauliai
People from Kovno Governorate
Academic staff of Moscow State University
Odesa University alumni
Taras Shevchenko National University of Kyiv alumni
Stalin Prize winners
Recipients of the Order of the Red Banner of Labour
Lithuanian Jews
Soviet Jews
Soviet mathematicians
Geometers
Differential geometers